Robert Fulton "Ace" Williams (March 18, 1917 – September 16, 1999) was a pitcher in Major League Baseball. He played for the Boston Bees / Braves. From 1943 to 1945 Williams's baseball career was interrupted while he served in World War II with the United States Navy.

References

External links

1917 births
1999 deaths
Major League Baseball pitchers
Boston Bees players
Boston Braves players
Hartford Bees players
Hartford Chiefs players
Portland (NEL) baseball players
Baseball players from New Jersey
People from Montclair, New Jersey
Sportspeople from Essex County, New Jersey
Amherst Mammoths baseball players
United States Navy personnel of World War II